National Route 499 is a national highway of Japan connecting between nagasaki and Akune, Kagoshima on the island of Kyushu, with total length has 27.7 km (17.2 mi).

References

499
Roads in Kagoshima Prefecture
Roads in Nagasaki Prefecture